The 2023 Epsom Derby will be the 244th annual running of the Derby horse race and is scheduled to take place at Epsom Downs Racecourse on 3 June 2023. The race will be sponsored for the third time by the online car-dealer Cazoo.

References

2023 in horse racing
2023 in English sport
 2023
2023 Epsom Derby
June 2023 sports events in the United Kingdom
Scheduled sports events